Thomas Ryder Johnson (17 May 1872 – 17 January 1963) was an Irish Labour Party politician and trade unionist who served as Leader of the Opposition from 1922 to 1927 and Leader of the Labour Party from 1917 to 1927. He served as a Teachta Dála (TD) for Dublin County from 1922 to 1927. He was a Senator for the Labour Panel from 1928 to 1934.

Early life
Born in Liverpool, Johnson worked on the docks for an Irish fish merchant, spending much of his time in Dunmore East and Kinsale. It was this way that he picked up ideas about socialism and Irish nationalism, joining in 1893 a Liverpool branch of the Independent Labour Party. In 1900 he started work as a commercial traveller, then moved in 1903 with his family to Belfast where he became involved in trade union and labour politics.

Labour activist
In 1907 Johnson helped James Larkin organise a strike in the port, but had to watch in dismay as the strike, which began with remarkable solidarity between labour, Orange, and nationalist supporters, collapsed in sectarian rioting. 
At various times he was the president, treasurer and secretary of the Irish Trades Union Congress which was, at that time, also the Labour Party in Ireland, until officially founded in 1912 by James Connolly and James Larkin.  Johnson became Vice-president of TUC in 1913, and President in 1915.

Johnson sympathized with the Irish Volunteers, many of whom were sacked from their jobs, for illegal activities.  During the Easter Rising, he noted in his diary that people in Ireland paid little heed to the fate of the defeated revolutionaries. He succeeded as leader of the Labour Party from 1917, when the party did not contest the 1918 general election.  When the British government tried to enforce conscription in Ireland in 1918, Johnson led a successful strike in conjunction with other members of the Irish anti-conscription movement.

Politician

He was later elected a TD for Dublin County to the Third Dáil at the 1922 general election and remained leader of the Labour Party until 1927. As such, he was Leader of the Opposition in the Dáil of the Irish Free State, as the anti-treaty faction of Sinn Féin refused to recognise the Dáil as constituted. He issued a statement of support for the Government of the 4th Dáil when the Army Mutiny threatened civilian control in March 1924.

Later life
Johnson is the only Leader of the Labour Party who served as Leader of the Opposition in the Dáil. He lost his Dáil seat at the September 1927 general election, and the following year he was elected to Seanad Éireann, where he served until the Seanad's abolition in 1936.

In 1896 he met Marie Tregay, then a teacher in St. Multose's National school, outside Kinsale. A native of Cornwall, she had advanced political views. They married in 1898 in Liverpool. Their only son born in 1899, Frederick Johnson, became a well-known actor. Thomas Johnson died on 17 January 1963 at 49 Mount Prospect Avenue, Clontarf, Dublin.

Each summer, Labour Youth holds the "Tom Johnson Summer School" to host panel discussions, debates and workshops.

Further reading
 Gaughan, John Anthony,Thomas Johnson, 1872–1963, (Mount Merrion 1980), 
 Johnson's diary of Easter week, in J.A. Gaughan, Thomas Johnson, 1872–1963 (Mount Merrion 1980)

References

 

1872 births
1963 deaths
Labour Party (Ireland) senators
Labour Party (Ireland) TDs
Leaders of the Labour Party (Ireland)
Members of the 3rd Dáil
Members of the 4th Dáil
Members of the 5th Dáil
Members of the 1928 Seanad
Members of the 1931 Seanad
Members of the 1934 Seanad
People of the Irish Civil War (Pro-Treaty side)
Politicians from Liverpool